The 2017–18 Eastern Washington Eagles men's basketball team represented Eastern Washington University during the 2017–18 NCAA Division I men's basketball season. The Eagles were led by first-year head coach Shantay Legans and played their home games at Reese Court in Cheney, Washington as members of the Big Sky Conference. They finished the season 20–15, 13–5 in Big Sky play to finish in a tie for third place. At the Big Sky tournament they defeated  Portland State and Southern Utah to advance to the championship game where they lost to Montana. They were invited to the College Basketball Invitational where they lost in the first round to Utah Valley.

Previous season
The Eagles finished the 2016–17 season 22–12, 13–5 in Big Sky play to finish in second place. As the No. 2 seed in the Big Sky tournament, they defeated Sacramento State in the quarterfinals before losing to Weber State in the semifinals. They were invited to the College Basketball Invitational where they lost in the first round to Wyoming.

On March 29, 2017, head coach Jim Hayford left Eastern Washington to take the head coaching job at in-state rival Seattle and was replaced by top assistant Shantay Legans.

Offseason

Departures

Incoming transfers

2017 recruiting class

Preseason 
In separate preseason polls of league coaches and media, the Eagles were picked to finish in seventh place (coaches) and sixth place (media) in the Big Sky. Senior forward Bogdan Bliznyuk was named to the preseason All-Big Sky team.

Roster

Schedule and results

|-
!colspan=9 style=|Exhibition

|-
!colspan=9 style=|Non-conference regular season

|-
!colspan=9 style=| Big Sky regular season

|-
!colspan=9 style=| Big Sky tournament

|-
!colspan=9 style=| CBI

Source

See also
 2017–18 Eastern Washington Eagles women's basketball team

References

Eastern Washington Eagles men's basketball seasons
Eastern Washington
Eastern Washington
Eastern Washington
Eastern Washington